Rolando Acosta  is the presiding justice of the New York Appellate Division of the Supreme Court, First Judicial Department.

Early life and education
Rolando Acosta was born and raised in Santo Domingo, Dominican Republic. When he turned 14, Acosta moved to New York City and attended DeWitt Clinton High School. There, he learned English as a second language, eventually graduating number 4 in his class of 1000 in 1975. Acosta refused the offer of Harvard, Princeton, and most other Ivies in favor of Columbia University. He graduated Columbia University in 1979 with a degree in Political Science. As the starting pitcher for the Columbia University Lions, Acosta received every athletic prize that could be awarded to a pitcher by the Ivy League and the Intercollegiate Baseball League during four years of varsity play. He was on the First Team,  All Ivy League, three times and was Pitcher of the Year twice. He still holds Columbia's season and career wins records and was inducted to the Columbia University Athletic Hall of Fame in October 2008. After graduation Acosta considered going into professional baseball. However, under the advisement of his then girlfriend, author Vasthi Reyes-Acosta, he chose to attend Columbia Law School and graduated in 1982. Acosta was the recipient of the Medal for Excellence and the Wien Prize for Social Responsibility from Columbia University.

Legal career
Before becoming a judge, Acosta worked with the Legal Aid Society, where he was the attorney in charge of the civil trial office between 1994 and 1995,  as well as the director of government and community relations. He subsequently served on the New York City Civil Court from 1997 to 2002. He was a New York Supreme Court Justice, 1st Judicial District, from 2002 to 2008 and was designated a justice for the appellate division, First Judicial Department, in 2008 by Governor Eliot Spitzer. He was appointed a member of the New York State Commission on Judicial Conduct in 2010. On May 22, 2017 Governor Andrew Cuomo promoted Acosta to fill the First Department's presiding justice role.

See also
List of Hispanic/Latino American jurists

References

Living people
New York (state) lawyers
Dominican Republic emigrants to the United States
Columbia Law School alumni
Columbia College (New York) alumni
Columbia Lions baseball players
Hispanic and Latino American judges
DeWitt Clinton High School alumni
Year of birth missing (living people)